Imre Danka (24 December 1930 – 3 May 2014) was a Hungarian footballer who played as a goalkeeper.

Career
Born in Szombathely, Danka played for Szombathelyi Bőrgyár, Szombathelyi MTE, Szombathelyi Honvéd, Székesfehérvári Építők and Pécsi Dózsa.

He also earned four caps for the Hungarian national team.

Later life and death
Danka died on 3 May 2014.

References

1930 births
2014 deaths
Hungarian footballers
Hungary international footballers
Association football goalkeepers
Pécsi MFC players
Nemzeti Bajnokság I players
Sportspeople from Szombathely
20th-century Hungarian people